West Albion is an unincorporated community in Wright County, Minnesota, United States.  The community is located along Mitchell Avenue near Wright County Road 37.

West Albion is located within Albion Township and French Lake Township.  Nearby places include Annandale, Albion Center, and Maple Lake.  Wright County Road 5 is also in the immediate area.

References

Unincorporated communities in Minnesota
Unincorporated communities in Wright County, Minnesota